The RS Venture launched by RS Sailing in 2011 is a large, modern GRP dinghy. The design concept was to deliver a large multi-role dinghy suitable for cruising, training or even club racing, in response to growing demand from training centres, private customers and international RS dealers. The RS Venture can take a maximum capacity of 8 crew, however can also be sailed by just 2 making it popular with RYA training schools as well as racing and cruising families. The RS Venture can be purchased from any RS dealer around the world and in 2013 has won Sailing World's Boat of the Year accolade.

Performance and design
The RS Venture is a suitable dinghy for introducing newcomers to the sport of sailing, but is also a good boat to race. The hull is constructed from thick woven GRP skins and 3mm coremat, under a double layered gelcoat. There is the option to have either a standard centreboard or a ballasted centreboard and the ballasted version is being developed by RS Sailing to accommodate disabled sailors. This version is due for release in August 2013.

References

External links
 

Dinghies
2010s sailboat type designs
Boats designed by Phil Morrison
Sailboat types built by RS Sailing